This page lists more than 1,000 types of Italian cheese but is still incomplete; you can help by expanding it.

This is an article of Italian cheeses. Italy is the country with the highest variety of cheeses in the world, with over 2500 traditional varieties, among which are about 500 commercially recognized cheeses and more than 300 kinds of cheese with protected designation of origin (PDO, PGI and PAT). Fifty-two of them are protected at a European level. In terms of raw production volume, Italy is the third largest cheese producer in the European Union, behind France and Germany. Lombardy is the first Italian region for number of protected cheeses, with 77 varieties including Granone Lodigiano, ancestor of all Italian granular cheeses such as Grana Padano and Parmigiano-Reggiano, Mascarpone, and the well-known Gorgonzola blue cheese. Italian cheeses Mozzarella and Ricotta are some of the most popular cheeses worldwide.

See List of Italian DOP cheeses for a list of those Italian cheeses which have Protected Designation of Origin under EU law, together with their areas of origin.

A
 Abbamar – Sardinia; a semi-soft cheese made from a mixture of cows’ and sheep's milk
 Accasciato – Tuscany; (usually mixed) sheep and cow’s milk cheese
 Acceglio – Piedmont; a fresh cows’ milk cheese made in the area of Acceglio (province of Cuneo)
 Acidino (or Formaggio Acidino) – Veneto; a goats’ milk cheese
  Aglino
 Agrì di Valtorta – Lombardy; made with fresh cows’ or goats’ milk in the Alta Valle Brembana (Province of Bergamo)
 Ainuzzi – Sicily; a cows’ milk cheese made in Cammarata and San Giovanni Gemini (Province of Agrigento)
  Aladino
 Algunder Bauernkäse Halbfett – Burggrafenamt, South Tyrol
 Algunder Butterkäse – Burggrafenamt, South Tyrol
 Algunder Ziegenkäse – a goats’ milk cheese from Burggrafenamt, South Tyrol
  Alpeggio di Triora – Province of Imperia, Liguria
  Alpepiana – Lombardy
 Alpepiana Macig – Lombardy
  Alpigiana – South Tyrol
 Alpkäse – South Tyrol
 Amatriciano – Lazio, around Amatrice and Leonessa
 Ambra di Talamello – originated in Marche, it is a type of Formaggio di Fossa, a designation for cheeses that are aged underground
  Ambrosiana
 Animaletti di Provola – Calabria
  Arunda – South Tyrol
 Aschbacher Magerkäse – South Tyrol, from Burggrafenamt

 Asiago – DOP – Veneto, Trentino
 Asiago d'allevo (see Asiago)
 Asiago Montasio
 Asiago pressato (see Asiago)
 Asiago stravecchio
 Asìno – Friuli-Venezia Giulia
  Auricchio – Pieve San Giacomo, Province of Cremona, Lombardy

B

 Baciodilatte – Piedmont 

 Bagòs (synonym for Bagòss)
 Bagoss (synonym for Bagòss)
 Bagòss – Lombardy; a grana coloured with saffron from the Comune of Bagolino
 Bagòss di Bagolino (synonym for Bagòss)
 Baricot
 Bastardo del Grappa – Veneto; a cheese traditionally made with mixed milks, hence ‘bastardo’, in the area of Monte Grappa
 Bauernkäse – South Tyrol; a cheese made from pasteurised, semi-skimmed cow's milk around Meran and Vinschgau
 Bebé di Sorrento – Campania; a cow's milk cheese produced in a similar manner to  Caciocavallo sorrentino in the Sorrentine Peninsula in the Province of Naples
 Beddo – Piedmont; a soft, compact, white-bodied cheese made from cow's milk in the lower Cervo Valley in the Comune of Pralungo and the Oropa valley in the Comune of Biella
 Bedura
 Begiunn − Piedmont; a creamy-granular ricotta made in summer in the alpine pastures of Sauze d’Oulx and San Sicario (Comune of Cesana Torinese) in the upper Val di Susa, and also in Bardonecchia (Province of Turin)

 Bel Paese – Lombardy
 Bella Badia – South Tyrol; a soft cow's milk cheese, or recent introduction, made in the commune of Bruneck with milk from the mountain farmsteads of the Puster Valley
 Bella Lodi – Lombardy; typical Italian hard cheese from Lodi, "Granone" lodigiano
 Belicino – Sicily; a fresh sheep's mik cheese from the Belice valley, containing stoned olives of the type Oliva da Tavola Nocellara del Belice. The cheese, whose origins are post-World Two, is made within the communal territories of Calatafimi, Castelvetrano, Poggioreale, Salaparuta, Campobello di Mazara, Gibellina, Santa Ninfa, Petrosino and Salemi.
 Belmonte – Lombardy
 Bettelmatt – Piedmont
 Bergkäse – South Tyrol
 Bernardo – Lombardy
 Biancospino – Sardinia
 Bocconcini – Campania
 Bocconcini alla panna di bufala – Campania
 Bianco verde – Trentino; a cows’ milk cheese from Rovereto

 Bitto – DOP – Lombardy
 Bitto d'Alpe
 Bitto Valtellina (synonym for Bitto)
 Bleu d'Aoste – Aosta Valley
 Blu
 Blu Alpi Cozie – Piedmont 
 Blu Antico
 Blu del Moncenisio – Piedmont
 Blu del Moncenisio d'alpeggio – Piedmont 
 Blu di montagna – Piedmont
 Blu Val Chiusella – Piedmont
 Bonassai – Sardinia
 Bonrus – Piedmont
 Boscatella di Fiavè – Trentino; a recently developed soft cheese made in Fiavè
 Boschetto al Tartufo – Tuscany; a cheese incorporating pieces of white truffle
 Bormino – Lombardy
 Boves – Piedmont

 Bra – DOP – Province of Cuneo, Piedmont; made in three varieties:
 Bra d'alpeggio
 Bra duro
 Bra tenero
 Branzi – Val Brembana, Lombardy, a similar cheese to Formai del Mut
 Brebidor – Sardinia; a soft sheep’s milk cheese
 Brebiblu – Sardinia; a modern, soft, ‘blue’ (really green) sheep's milk cheese inoculated with Penicillium roqueforti, made by Argiolas Formaggi in Dolianova (Province of Cagliari)
 Brescianella – Lombardy
 Bricchetto tartufo
 Brocciu (see Brotzu) – Corsica 

 Bros Brös) – Langhe, Piedmont
 Brös – Piedmont, Liguria

 Brotzu – Corsica
 Brus (see Brös) – Piedmont, Liguria
 Brus da latte
 Brus da ricotta
 Bruss (see Brös)
 Bruss delle Langhe (see Brös) – Piedmont 
 Bruss di Castelmagno – Piedmont
 Bruss di Frabosa – Piedmont
 Bruz
 Bruz d'Murazzan – Piedmont 
 Bruz d'Murazzanivan – Piedmont 
 Bruzzu – Piedmont, Liguria
 Budino di capra con uvetta e vin santo
 Bufalona

 Burrata – type of mozzarella, stuffed with a mixture of mozzarella and cream
 Burrata delle Murge – Apulia; a Burrata produced since the early twentieth century in Andria (BA) and Martina Franca
 Burrata di Andria – Apulia; Burrata with PGI status
 Burrata di bufala – made from the milk of water buffalo
 Burrell – Lazio
 Burrino – Basilicata, Molise, Campania, Calabria
 Burrino e burrata di bufala (water buffalo's milk cheeses from Campania)
  Burrino farcito con soppressata – Basilicata
  Burrino in corteccia – Campania
 Busche – Veneto
 Butirro – Calabria
 Butterkäse (Lagundo) (see Algunder Butterkäse) – South Tyrol

C
 Cachat – Piedmont
  Cacio
  Cacio a forma di limone – Marche
 Cacio di fossa – Emilia-Romagna; hard, sharp sheep's milk cheese, not unlike Pecorino
  Cacio di vacca bianca – Abruzzo
  Cacio Etrusco Cencelle – Tarquinia, Lazio
  Cacio Etrusco Tarquinia – Tarquinia, Lazio
 Cacio figurato – Sicily
 Cacio magno – Lazio
  Cacio magno alle erbe – Lazio
 Cacio marcetto – Abruzzo
  Cacio ubriaco – Tuscany

 Caciocavallo

  Caciocavallo abruzzese – Abruzzo
  Caciocavallo affumicato – Campania
  Caciocavallo del Monaco – Campania
 Caciocavallo di bufala – Campania; in both smoked and un-smoked varieties, from Lazio)
  Caciocavallo di Castelfranco in Misciano – Campania
  Caciocavallo di Cimina – Calabria
  Caciocavallo farcito – Campania
  Caciocavallo di Godrano – Sicily
  Caciocavallo ragusano – DOP – Sicily; former name for the cheese now officially listed as Ragusano
 Caciocavallo silano – DOP – Calabria, Basilicata, Campania, Molise and Puglia
 Caciocavallo podolico – Basilicata, Campania, Calabria, Puglia (from Gargano); takes the name from the breed of the cow
  Caciocavallo podolico campano – Campania
  Caciocavallo podolico picentino – Campania

  Caciocotto – Basilicata
  Caciofiore aquilino – Abruzzo
 Cacioforte – Campania
 Cacioreale – Lombardy
 Cacioricotta – Campania, Abruzzo, Lazio, Calabria, Basilicata, Apulia
  Cacioricotta campana – Campania
 Cacioricotta di bufala – Lazio
  Cacioricotta di capra cilentina – Cilento, Campania
  Cacioricotta fresca – Lazio
 Cacioricotta lucano – Apulia, Campania, and especially Basilicata
  Cacioricotta pugliese – Apulia 
 Caciotta – Central and Southern Italy

 Caciotta amiatina – Tuscany
  Caciotta al peperoncino – Campania
  Caciotta calabra – Calabria
  Caciotta campana – Campania
  Caciotta del Fermano – Marche
  Caciotta del Montefeltro – Marche
  Caciotta del Monte Lazzarina – Emilia-Romagna
 Caciotta della Lunigiana – Tuscany 
 Caciotta misto pecora
 Caciotta degli Elimi – Sicily
 Caciotta dei Monti della Laga – Lazio
 Caciotta della sabina – Lazio
 Caciotta di Asiago – Veneto
 Caciotta di Brugnato – Liguria
 Caciotta di capra – Friuli-Venezia Giulia
 Caciotta di latte caprino
  Caciotta di Montemauro – Emilia-Romagna
 Caciotta di pecora
 Caciotta genuina romana – Lazio
 Caciotta mista della Tuscia – Lazio
 Caciotta di bufala – Lazio
 Caciotta di bufala pontina
  Caciotta Manzone
 Caciotta sarda – Sardinia
 Caciotta senese – Tuscany 
 Caciotta toscana – Tuscany
  Caciotta vaccina frentana – Abruzzo

 Caciottina
  Caciottina canestrata di Sorrento – Province of Naples, Campania
 Caciottina di bufala
 Caciottina di bufala di Amaseno – Lazio
 Caciottina di bufala di Amaseno aromatizzata – Lazio 
 Caciottone di Norcia – Umbria; applied for PGI status in 2021
 Cadolet di capra – Val Camonica, Lombardy
  Cafone – Sardiniaia
 Calcagno – a type of pecorino cheese prepared using raw sheep milk and peppercorns, it originated in Sardinia
 Callu de cabreddu – Sardinia

 Canestrato – Trentino, Apulia, Basilicata, Sicily, Sardinia
  Canestrato crotonese – Calabria
  Canestrato d'Aspromonte – Calabria
  Canestrato di Calabria – Calabria 

Canestrato di Moliterno – hard mixed sheep’s and goats’ milk cheese from Apulia; it is matured for at least 60 days and may be eaten at table or grated. The PGI status was registered in 2010.
Canestrato pugliese – Apulia; PDO cheese made in the Province of Foggia
  Canestrato sardo – Sardinia
Canestrato trentino – Trentino
  Canestrato vacchino – Sicily
  Candela di Langa – Piedmont
 Cansiglio – Province of Belluno, Veneto, Province of Pordenone, Friuli-Venezia Giulia
  Cappello del Mago – Piedmont
  Capretta – Sardinia
 Capridor – Sardegna
  Caprini bergamaschi – Province of Bergamo, Lombardy
 Caprino (goats’ cheese) – Piedmont, Lombardy, Veneto, Trentino, Friuli-Venezia Giulia, Calabria, Sardinia

  Caprino a coagulazione lattica – Lombardy
  Caprino a coagulazione presamica – Lombardy
  Caprino al lattice di fico – Marche
 Caprino al pepe di Bagnolo – Piedmont
 Caprino bicchierino – Piedmont
 Caprino da grattugia – Emilia-Romagna, Liguria
 Caprino dell'Aspromonte – Calabria
 Caprino degli Alburni – Campania
  Caprino della Carnia pasta dura e pasta morbida – Carnia, Province of Udine, Friuli-Venezia Giulia
 Caprino della Limina – Calabria
 Caprino della Val Brevenna – Liguria 
 Caprino della Val Vigezzo – Liguria
 Caprino di Baceno – Piedmont
 Caprino di Cavalese – Trentino
 Caprino di Demonte – Piedmont
 Caprino di malga delle Alpi Marittime – Piedmont
 Caprino di Montefalcone del Sannio – Molise 
 Caprino di Rimella – Piedmont
  Caprino di Urbino – Marche
 Caprino Francese – Tuscany
 Caprino fresco – Abruzzo
 Caprino fresco veneto – Veneto
 Caprino lattico piemontese – Piedmont
 Caprino lombardo - Lombardy
 Caprino ossolano – Piedmont
 Caprino presamico piemontese – Piedmont
  Caprino sardo – Sardinia
  Caprino spazzacamino
 Caprino stagionato – Basilicata, Campania
 Caprino trentino – Trentino
 Caprino vaccino – Lombardy
 Caprino Valle – Piedmont
 Caprino valsesiano – Piedmont

 Cappuccetto Rosso – Piedmont
 Capriola
 Capritilla – Piedmont 
 Carboncino – Piedmont 
 Carletta-Tometta cremosa di pecora – Piedmont
 Carlina Robiola di pura capra
 Carmasciano – Campania 
 Carnia – Carnia, Province of Udine, Friuli-Venezia Giulia
 Casale de Elva – Province of Cuneo, Piedmont; cheese made in the Commune of Elva (CN), in the upper Val Maira which may be sold fresh or aged. In the latter case it resembles Castelmagno. Alternative names include Toma di Elva, Caso di Elva and Tumo de Caso).
 Casalina – Veneto
 Casareccio di Gorreto – Liguria
 Casàt Gardesano
  Casatella
 Casatella Romagnola – Emilia-Romagna 
 Casatella Trevigiana – Veneto 
 Casatta nostrana di Corteno Golgi – Lombardy
 Casciotta di Urbino – DOP – Marche
 Casel Bellunese – Province of Belluno, Veneto
  Casera
 Casera Crotto
  Casera giovane Valtellina – Valtellina, Lombardy
 Casera uso monte
 Casieddu di Moliterno – Basilicata
  Casizolu - Sardinia
 Casizolu di pecora – Sardinia
  Caso
 Caso conzato – Campania
 Caso di Elva (synonym for Casale de Elva) – Piedmont
 Caso peruto – Campania
 Casolet – Lombardy, Trentino
 Casolet della Val di Sole – Lombardy
 Casoretta – Lombardy
 Cassatella
 Castel Ariund – strongly flavoured cows milk cheese from Entracque in the Maritime Alps of the Province of Cuneo, Piedmont, often eaten with the local honey

 Castelmagno – DOP – Piedmont
 Castelrosso – Piedmont 
  Casu – Sardinia
Casu axedu – Sardinia
 Casu becciu – Sardinia
 Casu cundhídu (see Casu marzu) – Sardinia

Casu marzu or formaggio marcio – traditional Sardinian sheep milk cheese, notable for containing live insect larvae
 Casu modde (see Casu marzu) – Sardinia
Casu de cabreddu – Sardinia
Casu friscu – Formaggio fresco from Sardinia
Casu spiattatu – Sardinia
 Cavrin (Cevrin) di Coazze – Piedmont; goat cheese
 Cesio – Veneto
 Chabri stagionato – Piedmont 
 Charbonet
 Cherz – Veneto; a name used in Livinallongo del Col di Lana for Pressato
 Ciabutin – Piedmont
 Ciabutin al tartufo nero – Piedmont; with black truffle
 Cimbro – Veneto
 Cingherlino (Zincarlin) – Lombardy
 Cofanetto – Sicily
 Comelico – Veneto
 Conciato di San Vittore – Lazio
 Conciato romano – Lazio
 Contrin – Veneto
 Cosacavaddu ibleo – Sicily
 Costa d'Oro – Sardinia
 Crema
 Crema del Friuli – Friuli-Venezia Giulia
 Crema del Cuc – Friuli-Venezia Giulia
 Crema del Gerrei – Sardinia
 Crema di Fobello capra – Piedmont
 Crescenza – Lombardy
 Crottino al tartufo – Lombardy
 Crucolo – Trentino; cow’s milk
 Crutin – Piedmont
 Çuç di mont – Friuli-Venezia Giulia 
 Cuincir – Friuli-Venezia Giulia 
 Cuor di Neve
 Cuor di Neve
 Cuor di Valle – Lombardy 

 Cusiè – Piedmont

D

  Darraghetto di Viareggio – Tuscany
 Degli Albanesi – Calabria
 Del Colle
 Delizia del Colle
  Devero
 Dobbiaco – South Tyrol
 Dolce Isola misto
 Dolcelatte – cheese related to Gorgonzola, made for the export market
 Dolce sardo – Sardinia
 Dolcezza d'Asiago – Veneto
 Dolomiti – Trentino
  D'ora ligure – Liguria
  Due latti quadrotta delle Langhe – Piedmont

E
  Erborinato
 Erborinato di Artavaggio – Lombardy
  Erborinato di capra – Piedmont
  Erborinato di monte 
  Erborinato di pecora delle Alpi Cozie – Piedmont
  Erborinato misto capra – Sardinia
 Ericino – Sicily
 Escarun di pecora – Piedmont

F
 Falagone – Basilicata
 Farci-Provola – Calabria
 Fatulì della Val Saviore – Lombardy
 Fallone di Gravina – Apulia 
 Felciata di Calabria – Calabria
  Fiacco di capra – Lombardy
  Fior – Trentino
 Fior di campo
 Fior di latte
 Fior di latte laziale – Lazio
 Fior di monte – Trentino
 Fiordivalle – Sardinia
  Fiore
 Fiore sardo – DOP – Sardinia
 Fiore sicano – Sicily
  Fioreta – Veneto
 Fiorone della Valsassina – Province of Lecco, Lombardy
 Fiurit – Lombardy
 Flors – Friuli-Venezia Giulia
 Fodòm – Livinallongo del Col di Lana, Province of Belluno, Veneto
  Fondue – Aosta Valley, Piedmont
 Fontal – Trentino
 Fontal Fiavè – Trentino

 Fontina – DOP – Aosta Valley
  Formadi – Friuli-Venezia Giulia
  Formandi frant
 Formadi salat (also known as formaggio salato, and related to Asìno)
  Formaggella – Piedmont, Lombardy

 Formaggella del Bec – Lombardy
 Formaggella del Luinese
 Formaggella dell'Adamello
 Formaggella della Val Brembana
 Formaggella della Val Camonica
 Formaggela della Val di Sabbia
 Formaggella della Val di Scalve
 Formaggella della Val Seriana
 Formaggella della Val Trompia
 Formaggella di caglio – Piedmont
 Formaggella tremosine
 Formaggella uso monte
 Formaggella Valcavallina

  Formaggello spazzacamino – Val Vigezzo, Piedmont
  Formaggetta
 Formaggetta della Valle Argentina – Liguria
 Formaggetta di Bonassola – Liguria
 Formaggetta di mucca
  Formaggetta di Stella San Giovanni – Liguria
 Formaggetta savonese – Liguria
 Formaggina
 Formaggio

 Formaggio a crosta rossa
  Formaggio agordino di malga – Province of Belluno, Veneto
 Formaggio Alta Pusteria (see Hoch Pustertaler) – South Tyrol
  Formaggio Bastardo del Grappa – Veneto
 Formaggio caprino del Cilento – Campania
 Formaggio caprino della Limina – Province of Reggio Calabria, Calabria
 Formaggio coi vermi – Lombardy
 Formaggio caprino d'alpeggio – Piedmont 
 Formaggio da spalmare
 Formaggio dei Zaccuni
 Formaggio d'alpeggio di Triora – Liguria
 Formaggio d'alpe – Piedmont
 Formaggio del cit – Friuli-Venezia Giulia
 Formaggio del Gleno – Lombardy
 Formaggio del fieno
  Formaggio del monte – South Tyrol
  Formaggio delle Langue o Trifulin – Piedmont
 Formaggio di capra
 Formaggio di capra di Calabria – Calabria
 Formaggio di "caso" – Piedmont
 Formaggio di colostro ovino – Sardinia
 Formaggio di Fossa – Emilia-Romagna, Marche
  Formaggio di malga dei 7 comuni – Veneto
 Formaggio di Menconico – Lombardy
 Formaggio di montagna
  Formaggio di montagna di Sesto – South Tyrol 
  Formaggio di montagna friulano – Friuli-Venezia Giulia
  Formaggio fiore or Fiore sardo – Sardinia
 Formaggio in crema – Piedmont
  Formaggio marcio or casu marzu – Sardinia
  Formaggio pecorino di Atri – Abruzzo
  Formaggio Piave – Veneto
  Formaggio pressato – Lombardy
 Formaggio salato o Asino (synonym for Formadi salat) Friuli-Venezia Giulia
 Formaggio saltarello – Friuli-Venezia Giulia
 Formaggio di Santo Stefano di Quisquina – Sicily
 Formaggio semigrasso d'alpe – Lombardy
  Formaggio ubriaco – Friuli-Venezia Giulia
 Formaggio Val Seriana – Lombardy

 Formaggiola caprina – Emilia-Romagna
 Formaggiu ri capra

  Formai
 Formai de Livign – Province of Sondrio, Lombardy
 Formai de Mut – Val Brembana, Lombardy
 Formai de Mut dell'Alta Valle Brembana – DOP – Lombardy
 Formaio embriago – Veneto
 Furmaggitt di Montevecchia – Lombardy
 Furmaggiu du quagliu – Calabria
  Furmai
 Furmai del sieur Mario – Lombardy
  Furmai marçèt – Lombardy
  Formazza – Piedmont 
 Formella del Friuli – Friuli-Venezia Giulia
 Frachet – Piedmont
 Fresa – Sardinia
 Frico balacia – Friuli Venezia Giulia
 Frue – Sardinia

G
 Galbanino
 Garda Tremosine – Lombardy
  Giacobin de Zena
  Giganti – Basilicata
 Giglio sardo – Sardinia
  Gineprino – Umbria
  Gingherlino – Lombardy
 Giuncata – Liguria, Calabria, Sicily
 Gioda – Piedmont 
 Gioddu – Sardinia
 Giuncà – Piedmont
  Gorga Ciccarelli Viareggio – Tuscany

 Gorgonzola – DOP – Lombardy, Piedmont
  Gorgonzola a due paste
  Gorgonzola con la coda
  Gorgonzola bresciano – Lombardy
  Gorgonzola tipo piccante
 Gran cacio di Morolo – Morolo, Lazio 
 Gran Cacio Etrusco – Lazio
 Grana – class of hard, mature cheeses
  Grana calabrese – Calabria
 Grana Padano – DOP – Lombardy, Piedmont, Trentino, Veneto, Emilia‑Romagna
 Grana Trentino – Trentino
 Grande Vecchio di Montefollonico – Tuscany
 Granone Lodigiano – Lombardy
  Grappino
 Grasso d'alpe – Piedmont
 Graukäse – South Tyrol
 Graukäse della Valle Aurina – South Tyrol
  Gresal – Veneto; the name used in Sedico for Pressato
  Groviera La Leonessa – Veneto
 Guttus di pecora grossetano – Tuscany

H
 Hoch Pustertaler – South Tyrol; a cow's milk cheese, also known as formaggio Alta Pusteria; made in the communes of Toblach and Niederdorf

I 
  Incavolata - Piedmont; soft mixed milk cheese (such as robiola), wrapped in cabbage leaves
 Ircano – Sardinia; cheese made from goats’ milk in the communes of San Nicolò Gerrei, Tertenia and Guspini
 Italico – Lombardy; cows’ milk cheese made particularly in the provinces of Lodi and Pavia; a synonym for Bel Paese

J 
  Jasperino lombardo – Lombardy

K 
  Kiba torinese – Province of Turin, Piedmont

L
  Lacarian
  Lagrein – South Tyrol
  La Res – Piedmont
 Latteria – Lombardy, Friuli-Venezia Giulia
 Latteria Delebio – Lombardy
 Latteria di Fagagna – Province of Udine, Friuli-Venezia Giulia
  Latteria di Livigno – Valtellina, Lombardy
  Liptauer triestino – Province of Trieste, Friuli-Venezia Giulia

M
 Macagn – Piedmont; mountain cows’ milk cheese made in the province of Vercelli in the areas of Biella and the Valsesia
 Maccagno o Toma Maccagno – Lombardy
 Madonie Provola – Sicily; stretched curd cows’ milk cheese made in the mountains of Madonie in the province of Palermo
 Maggot cheese – Sardinia
 Magnocca – Lombardy
 Maioc-Magnocca gordana – Lombardy
  Magnùn – Piedmont
  Magro di piatta – Lombardy
 Maiorchino – Sicily
 Maiorchino di Novara di Sicilia – Sicily
  Malga
 Malga altopina o dei Sette Comuni – Veneto
 Malga bellunese – Province of Belluno, Veneto
 Malga Fane – South Tyrol
 Malga o Ugovizza – Friuli-Venezia Giulia
 Malga stagionato nelle vinacce – South Tyrol
 Malga Stelvio – Lombardy, South Tyrol
 Manteca – Apulia, Campania, Molise, Basilicata 
  Maria provolone di Potenza – Basilicata
 Marzolina – Lazio
  Marzolino – Tuscany
 Marzolino del Chianti – Tuscany
 Marzolino di Lucardo – Tuscany
  Marzotica – Province of Lecce, Apulia
 Mascarpin de la Calza – Lombardy
 Mascarpa – Lombardy
 Mascarpone – Lombardy 
 Mascarpone di bufala – Campania
 Mascarpone di bufala di Battipaglia – Campania
 Mascarpone torta – Mascarpone layered with basil leaves and pine kernels

 Mattone or Zeigel – South Tyrol
 Mattonella al rosmarino
 Matusc o Magro di latteria – Lombardy
 Mezzapasta – Piedmont
  Millefoglie all'aceto balsamico or Marzemino – Veneto
  Misto
 Misto capra
 Misto capra di malga – Veneto
 Misto pecora fresco dei Berici – Veneto
 Moesin di Fregona – Veneto
 Mollana della Val Borbera – Liguria 
 Moncenisio (see Murianengo) – Piedmont
 Montagna
 Montanello (Caciotta dolce) – Tuscany

 Montasio – DOP – Friuli‑Venezia Giulia, Veneto
  Mont Blanc – Aosta Valley
  Mont Blanc al pepe – Aosta Valley
 Monte Baldo – Trentino 
 Monte Baldo primo fiore – Trentino
 Monte delle Dolomiti – Trentino
 Monte Veronese – DOP – Province of Verona, Veneto
 Monte Veronese di malga – Province of Verona, Veneto
 Monte Veronese ubriaco all’amarone – Province of Verona, Veneto
 Montébore – Piedmont; cheese made from mixed cows’ and sheep's milk in the south-east of the (province of Alessandria) close to the Ligurian border, particularly in the area of Mongiardino Ligure
 Montegranero – Marche
 Morello – Tuscany; cheese made from ewe's milk with added live lactic cultures
 Morlâc – Veneto 
 Morlacco (or Morlacco di Grappa) – area of Monte Grappa, Veneto
 Mortrett (Murtret) – Piedmont
 Mortaràt – Piedmont; class of cheeses from the area of Biella in which the curds are coated with natural flavourings such as alpine herbs, spices, walnuts, maize flour. Examples include Ostrica di montagna, Ciambella all'Aglio, Maccagnetta alle erbe, Maccagnetta alle noci, and Mattonella al rosmarino
 Mortaràt Ciambella aromatica – Piedmont
 Motelì – Val Camonica, Lombardy 
 Motta – Piedmont 
 Mottolina (historical name for Bettelmatt – Piedmont
 Mottolino – Piedmont 

 Mozzarella – Campania, Provinces of Latina and Frosinone, Lazio, Apulia
 Mozzarella di bufala campana – DOP – Campania, Lazio, Apulia
 Murazzano – DOP – Piedmont
 Murianengo – Piedmont; also known as Moncenisio this is a Gorgonzola-like cows’ milk cheese from the province of Turin.
 Mursin – Piedmont
 Murtarat – Piedmont 
 Musulupu – Calabria
 Mustela – Sardinia

N
 Nevègal – Veneto 
 Nis – Emilia-Romagna
  Nocciolino di Ceva – Piedmont
  Nostrale d'alpe – Piedmont
  Nostrano (local produce)

 Nostrano di malga
 Nostrano d'alpe – Piedmont
 Nostrano de casèl – Trentino
  Nostrano del Primiero (see Nostrano della Val di Fassa) – Trentino
 Nostrano di Costalta – Trentino
  Nostrano di Crodo – Piedmont
 Nostrano di latteria – Piedmont
 Nostrano di malga trentino – Trentino
 Nostrano Fiavè – Trentino
 Nostrano grasso – Lombardy
 Nostrano misto capra – Trentino
 Nostrano prealpino – Veneto
 Nostrano semigrasso – Trentino
 Nostrano della Val di Fassa – Trentino
 Nostrano Valchiese – Trentino
  Nostrano Valtrompia DOP – Lombardy

  Nusnetto bresciano – Province of Brescia, Lombardy

O
 Ol Sciür - Lombardy
 Ormea – Piedmont
 Orrengigo di Pistoia – Tuscany
 Ortler – South Tyrol
 Ostrica di montagna – Piedmont; one of the Mortaràt specialities of the area of Biella
 Ossolano d’alpe – Piedmont; cows’ milk cheese

P

 Paddaccio – Basilicata, Calabria
 Paddraccio – Basilicata 
 Padduni – Sicily
 Paglierina – Piedmont
  Paglierina appassita
 Paglierina di rifreddo – Piedmont
  Paglietta – Piedmont
  Paglietta delle Langhe – Piedmont
  Paglietta piemontese – Piedmont
 Pallone di Gravina – Apulia and Basilicata
 Pampanella – Abruzzo, Apulia
  Pancette – Basilicata
 Pannarello – Friuli-Venezia Giulia, Trentino
 Pannerone Lodigiano – Lombardy

 Parmigiano-Reggiano – DOP – Emilia-Romagna, Lombardy
  Pastore
 Pastorella del Cerreto di Sorano – Tuscany
 Pastorino – Sardinia 
  Pecora
  Pecoricco – Apulia
  Pecorini – Calabria
 Pecorino – sheep’s-milk cheese

 Pecorino a crosta fiorita – Tuscany
 Pecorino baccellone – Tuscany
  Pecorino bagnolese – Piedmont
 Pecorino brindisino – Province of Brindisi, Apulia
  Pecorino d'Abruzzo – Abruzzo
 Pecorino dei Berici – Veneto 
 Pecorino del Casentino – Tuscany
 Pecorino del Parco di Migliarino-San Rossore – Tuscany
 Pecorino della costa apuana – Liguria
 Pecorino della Garfagnana – Tuscany
 Pecorino della Lunigiana – Tuscany
 Pecorino della Versilia – Tuscany
 Pecorino delle balze volterrane – Tuscany
  Pecorino di Amatrice – Lazio
 Pecorino di Carmasciano – Campania
  Pecorino di Farindola – Abruzzo
 Pecorino di Filiano – hard pecorino from the Province of Potenza, Basilicata, for which an application for PDO status was published in the Official Journal of the European Union on 19.4.2007
 Pecorino di Garfagnina – a Tuscan Pecorino made with milk from Garfagnina Bianca ewes
  Pecorino di Moliterno – Basilicata 
 Pecorino di montagna
 Pecorino di Osilo – Sardinia
  Pecorino di Pian di Vas – Friuli-Venezia Giulia
  Pecorino di Pienza stagionato – Tuscany
  Pecorino di Romagna – Emilia-Romagna 
  Pecorino fiorone – Lombardy
  Pecorino foggiano – Province of Foggia, Apulia
 Pecorino leccese – Province of Lecce, Apulia
  Pecorino lucano – Basilicata
  Pecorino Monte Re – Friuli-Venezia Giulia
 Pecorino Romano – DOP – Lazio, Tuscany, Sardinia
 Pecorino rosso volterrano – Tuscany
 Pecorino sardo – DOP – Sardinia
 Pecorino senese – Siena, Tuscany
 Pecorino siciliano – DOP – Sicily
  Pecorino stagionato in foglie di noce
  Pecorino Subasio (an alternative name [in dialect] for Pecorino umbro)
 Pecorino toscano – DOP – Tuscany
 Pecorino umbro – Umbria
 Pecorino veneto – Veneto

 Pepato
 Peretta – Sardinia
 Perlanera – Sardinia 
 Pettirosso "Tipo Norcia" – Tuscany 
 Piacentinu or Piacentino
 Piacentinu di Enna or Piacentino ennese – Sicily
 Piattone – Valtellina, Lombardy 
 Piave – DOP – Veneto
  Piave Fresco
  Piave Mezzano
  Piave Vecchio
  Piave Vecchio Selezione Oro
  Piave Vecchio Riserva
 Piddiato – Sicily
 Pierino – Piedmont
  Pioda Santa Maria – Piedmont
  Piodino – Piedmont 
  Piramide – Piedmont
  Piramide di capra
  Piramide in foglia
 Piscedda – Sardinia
 Pirittas – Sardinia
  Pojna enfumegada (see Poina enfumegada) – Trentino
 Poina enfumegada – Trentino
 Pratolina – Tuscany
 Pressato – Veneto
 Presolana-Valseriana – Lombardy
 Prescinseua – Liguria
 Primo sale – Sicily
 Primolino – Piedmont 
 Primusali – Sicily
  Provola
 Provola affumicata – smoked cow’s milk cheese from Campania
 Provola affumicata di bufala – smoked water buffalo’s-milk cheese from Campania
 Provola di bufala – water buffalo's-milk cheese from Lazio: provinces of Rome and Frosinone
 Provola affumicata di bufala – smoked water buffalo's-milk cheese from Lazio: provinces of Rome and Frosinone
 Provola Capizzi – Sicily
 Provula casale (Floresta) – Sicily
  Provola dei Monti Sicani – Sicily
 Provola dei Nebrodi – Sicily
 Provola delle Madonie – Sicily
 Provola ragusana – Sicily
 Provola siciliana – Sicily
  Provola silana – Calabria
  Provole – Basilicata

 Provolone
  Provolone del Monaco – Campania
  Provolone piccante – Lombardy, Veneto
 Provolone sardo – Sardinia
  Provolone siciliano – Sicily
 Provolone Valpadana – DOP – Lombardy, Veneto, Emilia-Romagna, Trentino
  Provolone Vernengo – Lombardy, Emilia-Romagna, Veneto, Trentino
 Pusteria – South Tyrol
 Pustertaler – South Tyrol
  Puzzone
  Puzzone Bochiotti
 Puzzone di Moena – Trentino
  Puzzone Vandercaro

Q
  Quadro
  Quadro di capra
  Quadro provenzale
 Quagliata ligure – Liguria
 Quartirolo Lombardo – DOP – Lombardy

R

 Raschera – DOP – Piedmont
 Raschera d'alpeggio – Piedmont; a Raschera, made at least 900m above sea level in certain Alpine areas of the province of Cuneo
 Ragusano – DOP – Sicily;
  Rasco – Calabria
  Raspadüra
  Ravaggiolo romagnolo – Emilia-Romagna
  Raveggiolo – Tuscany
  Raviggiolo – Tuscany, Emilia-Romagna
 Raviggiolo di pecora
  Raviggiolu – Sardinia
 Reblec de crama – Aosta Valley; cow's milk
 Réblèque – Aosta Valley; cow's milk
  Reblo
  Reblò alpino (see Reblochon)
  Reblo cremoso della Val di Susa – Piedmont

 Reblochon – Piedmont
  Rebruchon (see Reblochon)
 Regato
 Renàz – Veneto 
 Riavulillo – Campania

 Ricotta

 Ricotta affumicata di Mammola – Calabria
  Ricotta caprina friulana – Friuli-Venezia Giulia
 Ricotta di bufala
 Ricotta di bufala affumicata
 Ricotta di bufala infornata
 Ricotta di bufala salata
 Ricotta essiccata di bufala
 Ricotta fresca di bufala
 Ricotta di fuscella – Campania
  Ricotta forte – Campania
 Ricotta gentile – Sardinia 
 Ricotta moliterna – Sardinia
 Ricotta mustia – Sardinia
  Ricotta pecorina Monte Re – Friuli-Venezia Giulia
 Ricotta romana – DOP – Lazio
 Ricotta salata,,
  Ricotta siciliana – Sicily
  Ricotta vaccina affumicata ossolana – Piedmont

Ricotta forte – Apulia

 Rigatino di Castel San Pietro – Emilia-Romagna

 Robiola

 Robiola Alta Langa – Piedmont
 Robiola bresciana – Lombardy
   Robiola Cavour – Piedmont
   Robiola contadina – Piedmont
 Robiola d'Alba al tartufo – Piedmont
   Robiola della nonna
 Robiola della Val Bormida – Liguria
 Robiola della Valsassina – Lombardy
   Robiola delle Langhe – Piedmont
 Robiola di Bossolasco – Piedmont
 Robiola di Castel San Giovanni – Emilia-Romagna
 Robiola di Ceva o Mondovì – Piedmont
 Robiola di Cocconato – Piedmont
   Robiola di Introbio – Lombardy
 Robiola di Montevecchia – Lombardy
   Robiola di pecora
 Robiola di Roccaverano – DOP – Piedmont
   Robiola di serosa
   Robiola La Rustica – Lombardy
   Robiola piemontese classica – Piedmont

   Romita piemontese – Piedmont
 Rosa Camuna – Val Camonica, Lombardy; mild compact paste cheese made with partially skimmed cow's milk
   Rosso di lago – Piedmont

S
 Salignon – lower Aosta Valley; goats’ and/or sheep’s milk cheese, usually smoked
 Salagnun – Piedmont 
 Salato
 Salato duro friulano – Friuli-Venezia Giulia
 Salato morbido del Friuli – Friuli-Venezia Giulia
 Salgnun or Salignun) – Lombardy
  Salondro or Solandro – Trentino
  Salondro di malga
  Salondro magro
 Salva – Lombardy
 Santo Stefano d'Aveto (also known as San Stè) – from the upper Aveto valley and particularly from within the municipal boundaries of the comuni of Rezzoaglio and Santo Stefano d'Aveto, Liguria
 Sappada – Province of Belluno, Veneto
 Saras del Fèn – Piedmont
 Sarasso – Liguria
 Sarazzu (see: Sarasso) – Liguria
 Sargnon or Serniun – Piedmont
  Sbrinz – Lombardy
 Scacciata
 Scacione or Caprone – Lazio

 Scamorza
 Scamorza calabra – Calabria
 Scamorza di bufala – Campania
 Scamorza molisana – Molise
  Scheggia – Umbria
 Schiz – Veneto
 Schlander – South Tyrol
 Scuete frante – Friuli-Venezia Giulia
 Scuete fumade or Ricotta affumicata – Friuli-Venezia Giulia
 Scimuda d’alpe – Lombardy
 Scimudin – Lombardy
 Scimut – Lombardy
 Scodellato
  Secondo sale – Sicily
 Seras – lower Aosta Valley; cows’ milk cheese known since 1267 and often eaten with polenta
 Seré (see: Seras) – Aosta Valley 
 Seirass – Piedmont
 Seirass del Fen (see Seras) – Piedmont
 Seirass del Lausun – Piedmont
 Seirass di latte – Piedmont
 Seirass di siero di pecora
 Seirass stagionato
  Semicotto – Sardinia 
 Semicotto caprino – Sardinia 
 Semicotto ovino – Sardinia
 Semitenero di Loiano – Emilia-Romagna 
 Semuda – Lombardy

  Sigarot – Piedmont 
  Sigarot cenese
  Sigarot miele – Piedmont
  Sigarot naturale – Piedmont
  Silandro – South Tyrol
 Silter – Lombardy
 Silter della Val Camonica – Lombardy
 Shtalp – Calabria

 Soera (Sola della Valcasotto) – Piedmont
  Sola – Piedmont
  Sola stagionata – Piedmont 
  Sora – Piedmont
  Sora di pecora brigasca – Piedmont
  Sora tre latti – Piedmont
 Sot la Trape – Friuli-Venezia Giulia

 Sottocenere al tartufo – Veneto 
 Spalèm – Lombardy
  Spessa – Trentino
 Spress – Piedmont
 Spressa delle Giudicarie – DOP – Trentino
 Squacquerone di Romagna DOP – Emilia-Romagna
 Squarquaglione dei Monti Lepini – Lazio 
 Sta’el – Lombardy 
 Stagionato de Vaise – Liguria
  Stella di mare
 Stelvio or Stilfser – DOP – South Tyrol
  Sterzinger – South Tyrol
  Stintino di Luino – Lombardy

 Stracchino
 Stracchino della Valsassina – Lombardy
 Stracchino di bufala
 Stracchino di Nesso – Lombardy
  Stracchino nostrano di Monte Bronzone – Lombardy
 Stracchino orobico – Lombardy
  Stracchino tipico – Lombardy
  Stracchino toscano – Tuscany
 Stracciata – Molise
 Stracciatella di bufala – Apulia
 Strachet – Lombardy
 Strachitunt – Lombardy
 Stracòn – Veneto
 Strica – Molise

T

 Tabor – Province of Trieste, Friuli-Venezia Giulia
  Taburet – Piedmont
 Taleggio – DOP – Lombardy, Veneto and Piedmont
  Taleggio bergamasco – Lombardy
  Taleggio Mandello Lario – Lombardy
  Tella Alto Adige – South Tyrol
 Tendaio – semi-soft cows milk cheese made in Castiglione di Garfagnana, Tuscany, with ancient origins
 Testùn – Piedmont
  Testùn ciuc – Piedmont 
  Tipo
  Tipo dolce – Lombardy
  Tipo fresco – Piedmont
 Tipo malga friulano – Friuli-Venezia Giulia
  Tipo stagionato – Piedmont
  Tirabuscion
 Tirolese – South Tyrol
  Toblach or Toblacher Stangenkäse – South Tyrol (see: Dobbiaco)
 Toma

 Toma Ajgra – from the Valsesia in the Province of Vercelli, Piedmont
  Toma alpigiana – Piedmont
 Toma biellese – made with milk from the Pezzata Rossa d’Oropa cattle breed in the Province of Biella, Piedmont
  Toma brusca – Piedmont
  Toma dal bot – Piedmont
 Toma del lait brusc (or Formag lait brusc) – cows’ milk cheese from the Susa Valley, Piedmont – Piedmont
 Toma del Maccagno – cows’ milk cheese from the Biellese, Piedmont
  Toma del Mottarone – Piedmont
  Toma del Pastore – Piedmont
 Toma della Basilicata
 Toma della Valle di Susa – cows’ milk cheese from the Province of Turin, Piedmont
 Toma della Valle Stura – Province of Cuneo, Piedmont
 Toma della Valsesia – Province of Vercelli, Piedmont
 Toma di Balme – Piedmont
 Toma di Boves – Piedmont
 Toma di capra– Piedmont, Lombardy
  Toma di capra d’alpeggio – Piedmont
 Toma di capra o crava  – Piedmont 
 Toma di Celle – from the area around Celle Macra in the Valle Maira, Piedmont
  Toma di Elva (synonym for Casale de Elva) – Piedmont
 Toma of Gressoney – Aosta Valley, TTitsch: Kesch) – Lys Valley, Aosta Valley; a Toma made with cows’ milk in the Alpine summer pastures of the Lys Valley
 Toma di Lanzo – Piedmont
 Toma di Mendatica – Liguria, from the upper Valle Arroscia, the Val Roja, and the Valle Imperia
  Toma ossolana – Piedmont
  Toma ossolana al prunent – Piedmont
  Toma ossolana d’alpeggio – Piedmont 
  Toma ossolana di casa – Piedmont
  Toma ovicaprina – Piedmont
 Toma di Pragelato – Piedmont
 Toma di Valgrisenche – Valgrisenche, Aosta Valley) – Valgrisenche, Aosta Valley
 Toma lucana – Basilicata
 Toma piemontese – Piedmont; DOP cheese produced in the provinces of Novara, Verbania, Vercelli, Biella, Turin and Cuneo and in parts of the provinces of Asti and Alessandria
  Toma Val Pelice – Province of Turin, Piedmont

 Tombea – Lombardy
  Tometta – Piedmont
  Tometta al Barolo – Piedmont
 Tometta di Barge – Barge, Piedmont
  Tometta Monte Ciuc
  Tometta Valle Elvo – Valle dell’Elvo, Piedmont
 Tometto (Tumet) – Piedmont 
  Tomini di Bollengo e del Talucco – Piedmont
 Tomino – Piedmont

 Tomino canavesano asciutto – Canavese, Piedmont
 Tomino canavesano fresco – Canavese, Piedmont
  Tomino da padella – Piedmont
 Tomino del bec – Piedmont
  Tomino del boscaiolo – Piedmont
 Tomino del Bot – Province of Cuneo, Piedmont 
 Tomino del mel – Val Varaita, Province of Cuneo, Piedmont 
 Tomino del Talucco – Talucco, Piedmont
 Tomino delle Valli Saluzzesi – Province of Cuneo, Piedmont
 Tomino di Andrate – Andrate, Piedmont
 Tomino di Bosconero – Bosconero, Piedmont
 Tomino di Casalborgone – Casalborgone, Piedmont
 Tomino di Rivalta – Piedmont
 Tomino di San Giacomo di Boves – San Giacomo di Boves, Piedmont
 Tomino di Saronsella (Chivassotto) – Piedmont
 Tomino di Sordevolo – Sordevolo, Piedmont
 Tomino di Talucco – Piedmont
 Tomino "Montoso" – Piedmont

 Torta (cheese)
 Torta Orobica – Province of Bergamo, Lombardy
  Torta mascarpone
 Toscanello – Maremma, Tuscany
 Tosela – Trentino
 Tosèla del Primiero – Trentino
  Toumin dal mel – Piedmont
 Tre Valli – Province of Pordenone, Friuli-Venezia Giulia
  Treccia
 Treccia dura – Basilicata
 Treccia dei Cerviati e Centaurino – Campania
  Trifulin – Langhe, Piedmont
 Trizza – Sardinia
  Tronchetto
 Tronchetto alpino – Province of Piacenza, Emilia-Romagna 
  Tronchetto di capra – Langhe, Piedmont
  Tronchetto stagionato – Lombardy 
 Trugole – Province of Vicenza, Veneto 
 Tuma – Piedmont
 Tuma ‘d Trausela – Piedmont
  Tuma di Celle – Province of Cuneo, Piedmont
  Tuma di langa sotto vetro – Langhe, Piedmont
 Tuma sicula – Sicily 
  Tumazzu – Sicily
 Tumazzu di pecura ccu pipi – Sicily 
 Tumazzu di piecura – Sicily 
 Tumazzu di vacca – Sicily 
 Tumazzu di vacca ccu pipi – Sicily 
 Tumet di Pralungo – Piedmont
  Tumin
  Tumin del Mel – Melle, Piedmont
  Tumo de Caso (synonym for Casale di Elva) – Piedmont

U
 Ubriaco – Veneto 
  Ubriaco al Traminer di capra – Veneto
  Uova di bufala (see: Bocconcini) – Campania

V
 Vaciarin – Piedmont
 Vaciarin valsesiano – Valsesia, Piedmont
 Val Brandet – Lombardy
 Valcasotto – Piedmont
 Valle d’Aosta Fromadzo or Vallée d’Aoste Fromadzo – DOP – Aosta Valley
  Valligiano – Val Brembana, Lombardy
  Valsesia ubriaco – Valsesia, Piedmont
 Valtellina casera – DOP – Lombardy
  Vastedda – Sicily
 Vastedda della Valle del Belice – Belice Valley, Sicily
 Vastedda palermitana – Province of Palermo, Sicily
 Vézzena – Trentino

Z
 Ziegenkäse (see: Algunder Ziegenkäse) – South Tyrol
 Ziger – South Tyrol, Veneto
  Zigerkäse (synonym for Ziger) – South Tyrol
 Zighera – Trentino; a smoked cheese made in the mountains of Pinetano and the area of Valfloriana
  Zincarlin – Lombardy, Canton of Ticino
 Zumelle – Veneto
 Zufi – Piedmont; a fermented ricotta, somewhat related to Brös, made in Val Formazza, province of Novara
  Zuvi (synonym for Zufi.) – Piedmont

See also

 Italian cuisine
 List of cheeses

References

Bibliography
 Rubino, R., et al. (2005), Italian Cheese,

External links

 Prodottitipici.com, Formaggi e Latte  – provides extensive coverage of traditional varieties of Italian cheese
 Formaggio.it  – also covers a very wide coverage of Italian cheeses
 Milkonline.com  – concentrates (not exclusively) on PDO cheeses, often providing details of the production regulations
 Prodottitipici.com, Formaggi e Latte Bufalini 
 Agraria.org, Formaggi tipici 
 Prodotti Tradizionale SAG Elenco Regioni  – a list of traditional Italian food products by region
 Cheeses – Aosta Valley Tourism Board
 Assolatte – Associazione Italiana Lattiero Casearia

 
Cheeses
Italian

sv:Lista över italienska ostar